Outskirts or The Outskirts may refer to:

 Rural–urban fringe, a transition zone where urban and rural land uses mix at the edges of a city or town

Films
 Outskirts (film), a 1933 Soviet film by Boris Barnet
 The Outskirts (1998 film), a Russian satirical film by Pyotr Lutsik, loosely based on the 1933 film
 The Outcasts (2017 film) (working title The Outskirts), an American high-school comedy film

Other uses
 Outskirts (album), a 1987 album by Blue Rodeo
 Outskirts (journal), a feminist journal published by the University of Western Australia